Salam Jassem Hussein al-Obeidi (aka Major Salam, b: 1979) is an Iraqi officer who received media appraisal during the second Iraqi civil war and the Second battle of Mosul (2016-2017).
Salam Hussein is now Colonel.

Early life 
Salam Jassem Hussein studied linguistics at university, studying English and Hebrew when the 2003 Iraqi war starts. After the defeat of Saddam Hussein, Salam, against his father's wishes, entered the newly formed and Western-sponsored Iraqi army in late 2003. He was assigned to the Iraqi Counter-Terrorism Force (ICTF).

In 2004, he joined the fighting during the battle of Najaf against Shia militants from the Mahdi army.

Second Iraqi civil war 
When the second Iraqi Civil war erupted, Major Salam Hussein led the 2nd battalion of the 1st division (ISOF-1), part of the Iraqi Special Operations Forces, known as the Golden Division. Major Hussein is critical of  Iraq's political establishment, especially former Prime Minister Nouri al-Maliki, whom he regards as the main cause of his country's crisis. He forbade the use of influential Shia cleric Hussein's flag, frequently seen flying over Iraqi army's vehicles and voiced his opposition to anti-Sunni sectarian policies and violence supported or encouraged by various Shia politicians in power.

He joined the battles of Tikrit and Ramadi. On June 9, 2016, while involved in the battle of Fallujah where he sustained injuries from a missile attack.

In late 2016, while taking part in the second battle of Mossul, he led the Golden Division which breached Mosul's Eastern defenses on November 1, 2016. In late December 2016, after the conquest of the Eastern side of Mosul, he left for the US in order to train 6 months. He returned to Mosul in June 2017 with the rank of lieutenant-colonel, to lead the offensive on Mosul's old town, on the western bank of the river.

See also 

 Iraqi Special Operations Forces aka Golden Division
 Iraqi Civil War (2014–2017)
 Captain Harith al-Sudani 
 Abu Azrael
 Abu Tahsin al-Salhi

References 

 Fighting the Islamic State with Iraq's Golden Division: The Road to Fallujah, Vice News, June 17, 2016.

1979 births
Iraqi military personnel
Living people